A hydrogen internal combustion engine vehicle (HICEV) is a vehicle powered by a hydrogen-fueled internal combustion engine. Some versions are hydrogen-gasoline hybrids.

1800s

 1807 – Francois Isaac de Rivaz – the De Rivaz engine, the first internal combustion engine using hydrogen as a fuel
 1863 – Étienne Lenoir–  Hippomobile

BMW
 2002 – BMW 750hL
 2007 – Hydrogen 7 is powered by a dual-fuel internal combustion engine-liquid hydrogen
 2007 – BMW H2R speed record car – ICE-liquid hydrogen

CMB.TECH (Compagnie Maritime Belge)
 2017 - Hydroville - a hydrogen internal combustion engine (dual-fuel) ferry
 2021 - Dual Fuel Truck - a hydrogen internal combustion engine (dual-fuel) truck
 2021 - Hydrobingo - a hydrogen internal combustion engine (dual-fuel) ferry
 2022 - HydroTug - a hydrogen internal combustion engine (dual-fuel) tugboat

Hydrogen Car Company
 Hydrogen Car Company hydrogen-converted Nissan Frontier
 Hydrogen Car Company hydrogen-converted Shelby Cobra

Intergalactic Hydrogen
 Intergalactic Hydrogen hydrogen-converted Hummer

Mini
 MINI Hatch/Cooper "CleanEnergy" is a running experimental concept car with a dual-fuel engine

Mahindra & Mahindra
Mahindra HyAlfa: a hydrogen internal combustion engine auto rickshaw

Ford
 2001 – Ford P2000 concept car using the Zetec 2.0L engine. (Note: Ford had several concept vehicles that used the P2000 designation.)
 2006 – F-250 Super Chief a "Tri-Flex" engine concept pickup
 2006 – Ford E-450 H2ICE Shuttle Bus a 12-passenger shuttle bus with a supercharged V10 fueled by compressed hydrogen

Mazda
 1991 – Mazda HR-X hydrogen Rotary
 1993 – Mazda HR-X2 hydrogen Rotary
 1993 – Mazda MX-5 Miata hydrogen Rotary
 1995 – Mazda Capella, first public street test of the hydrogen Rotary engine
 2003 – Mazda RX-8 Hydrogen RE hydrogen-gasoline hybrid Rotary
 2005 – Mazda Premacy Hydrogen RE Hybrid
 2007 – Mazda Hydrogen RE Plug in Hybrid

Aston Martin

 Aston Martin, together with Alset GmbH, constructed the Aston Martin Hybrid Hydrogen Rapide S, a dual-fuel gasoline and hydrogen powered car used during 24H Nurburgring 2013

Revolve (Acquired by CMB.TECH)
 2010 – Ford Transit H2ICE

Chevrolet
 2010 Silverado

Ronn Motor
 2008 – Scorpion

Tokyo City University
 1974 – Musashi-1
 1975 – Musashi-2
 1977 – Musashi-3
 1980 – Musashi-4
 1982 – Musashi-5
 1984 – Musashi-6
 1986 – Musashi-7
 1990 – Musashi-8
 1994 – Musashi-9
 1997 – Musashi-10

Toyota
 2021- Modified Corolla Sport  
 2022 - Modified GR Yaris

University of California, Riverside
 1992 – Ford Ranger (Experimental Conversion)
 2000 - Modified Shelby Cobra It achieved a respectable 108.16 mph, missing the world record for hydrogen powered vehicles by 0.1 mph.

References

See also
List of fuel cell vehicles
List of production battery electric vehicles
History of the internal combustion engine
Timeline of hydrogen technologies

 
Hydrogen internal combustion engine vehicles